Islington is a district in London.

Islington may also refer to:

Places

United Kingdom 
Related to the district of London:
London Borough of Islington, the local authority containing the district
Metropolitan Borough of Islington, the historical former authority
Islington East (UK Parliament constituency), 1885–1974
Islington North (UK Parliament constituency), 1885–present
Islington South (UK Parliament constituency), 1885–1950
Islington South West (UK Parliament constituency), 1950–1974
Islington South and Finsbury (UK Parliament constituency), 1974–present
Islington West (UK Parliament constituency), 1885–1950
Islington East (London County Council constituency), 1889–1965
Islington North (London County Council constituency), 1889–1965
Islington South West (London County Council constituency), 1949–1965
Islington West (London County Council constituency), 1889–1949
The Islington, a live music venue
Islington, a village in Tilney St Lawrence, Norfolk
Islington, a district in Liverpool City Centre

Australia 
Islington, New South Wales, a suburb of Newcastle, New South Wales
Islington, South Australia, now Dudley Park, a suburb of Adelaide

Canada 
Islington-City Centre West, a central business district in Toronto
Islington Avenue, a major street in Toronto
Islington station (Toronto), a Toronto subway station
Heart's Delight-Islington, a town in Newfoundland and Labrador

United States 
Islington, a neighborhood of Westwood, Massachusetts

Other places 
Islington, Jamaica, a village in the parish of Saint Mary
Islington, Mpumalanga, a populated place in South Africa
Islington, New Zealand, a suburb of Christchurch

Other uses 
Islington (horse) (foaled 1999), a Thoroughbred racehorse
Islington College, Kathmandu, Nepal
The Angel Islington, a character in the fantasy series Neverwhere

See also 
Islington Station (disambiguation)
New Islington, Manchester
 Ilsington, a village in Devon, England
 Ingliston, an area in Edinburgh, Scotland